Avianca Flight 203 was a Colombian domestic passenger flight from El Dorado International Airport in Bogotá to Alfonso Bonilla Aragón International Airport in Cali, Colombia. It was destroyed by a bomb over the municipality of Soacha on November 27, 1989. All 107 people on board as well as three people on the ground were killed. The bombing had been ordered by the Medellín drug cartel.

Aircraft and crew 
The aircraft was a Boeing 727-21 with registration number HK-1803, serial number 19035, and manufacturing serial number 272. It had been purchased from Pan Am. The aircraft was built in 1966, and had its maiden flight on May 19 of the same year. The aircraft was delivered to Pan Am on May 28, and was registered as N326PA. Avianca purchased the aircraft on November 15, 1975, when it was re-registered as HK-1803.

The captain was José Ignacio Ossa Aristizábal, the first officer was Fernando Pizarro Esguerra, and the flight engineer was Luis Jairo Castiblanco Vargas. There were three flight attendants on board.

Flight 
Flight 203 took off as scheduled at 7:13 a.m. Eyewitnesses on the ground reported seeing fire erupt out of the right side of the aircraft's fuselage. A second blast ripped the airliner apart; the nose section separated from the tail section, which went down in flames. The wreckage was scattered in a three-mile radius around the town of Soacha. All 107 people on board were killed, as well as three people on the ground who were killed by falling debris.

Aftermath 
An investigation determined that plastic explosives were used to destroy the plane. Drug king Pablo Escobar, of the Medellín drug cartel, planned the bombing in the lead-up to the 1990 elections, hoping the bomb plot would kill presidential candidate César Gaviria Trujillo.  One account states that two unidentified men dressed in suits who worked for Escobar carried the bomb on board. The men sat in seats 18A and 18K, located above the main fuel tank. At the last moment, one of the men left the aircraft, while his partner stayed on board and was killed in the bombing. A young Colombian man named Alberto Prieto was duped into staying on the flight and activating the bomb once the aircraft had become airborne thus unknowingly killing himself; he had been told the device was just a recorder he had to turn on to record the conversation of a nearby couple of passengers; because of this, the man had been nicknamed "El Suizo", or "The Swiss", in reference to his role as a "suicide" bomber.
Gaviria was not on the aircraft, despite Escobar's expectations, and went on to become President of Colombia. Two Americans were among the dead, prompting the Bush Administration to begin Intelligence Support Activity operations to find Escobar.

Nine days after the bombing of the plane, the DAS Building bombing, presumably also ordered by the Medellín Cartel, killed 63 people in Bogotá.

Dandeny Muñoz Mosquera, the chief assassin for the Medellín Cartel, was convicted in 1994 in United States District Court of having been involved in the bombing and various other crimes, and was sentenced to 10 consecutive life sentences.

Avianca has not retired the flight number. Avianca 203 is, as of 2022, a flight from Orlando to Medellin.

Later events 
On November 28, 2016, the Colombian newspaper El Espectador started publishing an investigative report, consisting of 8 chapters, on Flight 203. It argues that the explosion was caused by a malfunctioning fuel pump inside a tank which had been reported several times before. The report was heavily criticized by Avianca and family members of the victims.

In popular culture   
This event is dramatized in Season 1, Episode 6 of Narcos (2015).

See also 

 Metrojet Flight 9268
 Iraqi Airways Flight 163
 Pan Am Flight 103
 Air India Flight 182

References

External links
 

1989 in Colombia
1989 crimes in Colombia
Mass murder in 1989
Aviation accidents and incidents in 1989
Terrorist incidents in South America in 1989
Terrorist incidents in Colombia in the 1980s
November 1989 events in South America
Airliner bombings
Aviation accidents and incidents in Colombia
Avianca accidents and incidents
Accidents and incidents involving the Boeing 727
Failed assassination attempts in South America
Mass murder in Colombia
Organized crime events in Colombia
Terrorist incidents in Colombia
Medellín Cartel
Pablo Escobar
1989 disasters in Colombia